A bookmark is used to keep one's place in a printed work. It can also refer to:

 Bookmark (digital), a pointer in a web browser and other software
 Bookmarks (album) by Five for Fighting
 Bookmarks (magazine), an American literary magazine
 Bookmark (TV series), a BBC Two TV series
 Bookmarks (TV program), an educational television show on Netflix
 Bookmarks (bookshop), a socialist bookshop in London
 Bookmark Biosphere Reserve, South Australia
 Bookmarking, method of genetic communication
 Enterprise bookmarking, a method of applying tags to data and content to improve enterprise search
 Social bookmarking, a method for internet users to store, organize, and share links to web pages
Book Marks, a review aggregation website of Literary Hub
 Bookmark, a television show on PBS from 1989 to 1991 hosted by Lewis H. Lapham